The BET Award for Best Female Hip Hop Artist is an award given to honor the outstanding achievements female artists have made in hip hop every year. The winner is determined based on sales and overall quality of content released within the eligibility period. The all-time winner in this category is Nicki Minaj with seven wins, she is also the most nominated artist with twelve nominations. Megan Thee Stallion is the current holder of the award, with her third win in 2022.

Winners and nominees
Winners are listed first and highlighted in bold.

2000s

2010s

2020s

Multiple wins and nominations

Wins

 7 wins
 Nicki Minaj
 5 wins
 Missy Elliott
 3 wins
 Megan Thee Stallion
 2 wins
 Remy Ma
 Cardi B
 1 win
 Eve
 M.I.A

Nominations

 12 nominations
 Nicki Minaj

 9 nominations
 Trina

 8 nominations
 Missy Elliott

 6 nominations
 Cardi B
 Remy Ma

 5 nominations
 Eve
 Lil' Kim
 Foxy Brown

 4 nominations
 Megan Thee Stallion

 3 nominations
 Dej Loaf
 Doja Cat
 Saweetie

 2 nominations
 Azealia Banks
 Da Brat
 Diamond
 Iggy Azalea
 Jacki-O
 Lil' Mama
 Latto
 Lizzo
 Rah Digga
 Rasheeda
 Shawnna

See also

 List of music awards honoring women
 BET Award for Best Male Hip Hop Artist

References

BET Awards
Hip hop awards
Music awards honoring women